is a Japanese light novel series written by Akira, with illustrations by Hidari. Shogakukan published 11 volumes from December 2009 to June 2013. A manga adaptation illustrated by Akira Nishikawa was serialized in Shogakukan's Weekly Shōnen Sunday from October 2012 to May 2013, and later in Shōnen Sunday S from June to September 2013. Its chapters were collected in four tankōbon volumes. A 12-episode anime television series adaptation by Shaft aired from January to March 2013.

Plot
Sasami Tsukuyomi is a high school shut-in who often stays at home and is doted upon by her older brother, Kamiomi. However, due to unknowingly possessing a god's power, Kamiomi's habit of trying to appease Sasami often puts the world into chaos, while the three Yagami sisters try to put a stop to it.

Characters

Sasami is a first-year high school student who lives with her older brother Kamiomi. She is a hikikomori (shut-in) and initially refuses to even go to school, but she later begins attending school in February near the end of her first year in high school. At home, Sasami uses a "Brother Surveillance Tool" on her computer to view the outside world. She possesses the power of Amaterasu, unconsciously causing powerful gods to protect her and her brother. For a while, she believed that the power of Amaterasu was transferred to her brother, just to find later that she never lost it at all.

Kamiomi is Sasami's older brother and is a teacher at her high school. His face is never shown as he is always hiding it with something, such as his briefcase. He has an intense love for his sister and dotes on her constantly as the men of the Tsukuyomi family are conditioned to serve, protect and eventually marry their sisters to keep the power of Amaterasu under the clan's possession.

Tsurugi is 31 years old, the eldest of the Yagami sisters, and is a teacher at Sasami's high school. Despite her age, she has the appearance of a little girl and has the personality of a middle-aged man. She often plays adult games in the staff room. Her name is based on Kusanagi no Tsurugi. Later it is revealed that she is Amaterasu herself, who became fed up of her power and passed it on to Sasami's distant ancestor.

Kagami is 16 years old, the second eldest of the Yagami sisters, and is Sasami's classmate. She is a plain girl and is constantly sleepy. She is a cyborg created from a part of Amaterasu who has a vast arsenal of magic and high-tech weapons hidden all over her body. Her name is based on Yata no Kagami.

Tama is nine years old, the youngest of the Yagami sisters, and is in third grade. In contrast of Tsurugi, despite Tama's young age, she has the appearance of an adult woman. However, she has the innocent personality of a girl her age or even younger. Her name is based on Yasakani no Magatama. Tama was created by Tsurugi to be the next vessel of Amaterasu's power after Sasami.

Juju is the mother of Sasami and Kamiomi.  She possessed the power of Amaterasu before Sasami. She wears Shinto attire, and is often seen with a khakkhara.

Media

Light novels
Sasami-san@Ganbaranai began as a light novel series written by Akira, with illustrations drawn by Hidari. Shogakukan published 11 volumes of the series under their Gagaga Bunko imprint from December 18, 2009 to June 28, 2013.

Manga
A manga adaptation illustrated by Akira Nishikawa was serialized in Shogakukan's Weekly Shōnen Sunday magazine from October 17, 2012 to May 8, 2013. It was subsequently transferred to Shōnen Sunday S, and serialized from June 25 to September 24, 2013. Four tankōbon volumes were released from December 18, 2012 to December 18, 2013.

Anime
A 12-episode anime television series adaptation, produced by Shaft and directed by Akiyuki Shinbo, aired in Japan from January 11 to March 29, 2013 on TBS and BS-TBS. Naoyuki Tatsuwa acted as assistant director, Katsuhiko Takayama wrote the series composition, and Yukari Hashimoto composed the series' music. Hiroki Harada designed the characters and acted as chief animation director alongside Takahiro Sasaki and Haruka Tanaka. Sentai Filmworks licensed the series for North American digital and home video release  and began streaming the series on Anime Network in January 2013.

Internet radio show
An Internet radio show to promote the anime titled  began broadcasting on January 15, 2013 and is hosted by Kana Asumi. The show is streamed online every other Tuesday, and is produced by the Japanese Internet radio station Lantis Web Radio.

References

External links
Manga official website at Web Sunday 
Anime official website 
Sasami-san@Ganbaranai at Anime Network

2009 fantasy novels
2009 Japanese novels
2012 manga
2013 anime television series debuts
Anime and manga based on light novels
Aniplex
Gagaga Bunko
Japanese fantasy novels
Light novels
Romantic comedy anime and manga
Sentai Filmworks
Shaft (company)
Shogakukan manga
Shōnen manga
Supernatural anime and manga
Television shows based on light novels
TBS Television (Japan) original programming